Thomas Francis Monteleone (born April 14, 1946) is an American science fiction author and horror fiction author.

Early life 
Monteleone attended a Jesuit high school, Loyola Blakefield, one year ahead of Tom Clancy. Monteleone studied at the University of Maryland, College Park, where he received degrees in English and Psychology. From 1969 to 1978 Monteleone worked as a psychotherapist in the Clifton T. Perkins Hospital Center in Jessup, Maryland, while studying English at the graduate level.

Career 
Monteleone has been a professional writer since 1972. Monteleone's first story appeared in Amazing Stories magazine in 1972. His first novel, Seeds of Change was the lead-off title in the critically unsuccessful Laser Books line of science fiction titles. He became a popular writer of supernatural thrillers. He has published more than 100 short stories in numerous magazines and anthologies. His best-selling novel, Blood of the Lamb was named a New York Times Notable Book of the Year.

His column of opinion and entertainment, "The Mothers And Fathers Italian Association," currently appears in Cemetery Dance magazine. He is the editor of nine anthologies, including the highly acclaimed, Stoker Award-winning  Borderlands series edited with his wife, Elizabeth. His stories have been nominated for many awards, and have appeared in many best-of-the-year compilations.

Monteleone's five collections of selected short fiction are Dark Stars and Other Illuminations (1981), Rough Beasts and Other Mutations (2003),The Little Brown Book of Bizarre Stories (2004), Fearful Symmetries (2004), and "Dark Arts" (2014). His novels, The Resurrectionist and Night of Broken Souls, global thrillers from Warner Books, received rave reviews and have been optioned for films. The Reckoning (2000), a sequel to The Blood of the Lamb, and The Eyes of the Virgin (2002) have been published by Forge. His omnibus volume of essays about the book and film industries entitled The Mothers And Fathers Italian Association was recently published by Borderlands Press (www.borderlandspress.com) and won the Bram Stoker Award for Non-Fiction. He is also the author of the bestseller, The Complete Idiot’s Guide to Writing a Novel (2004), and is currently at work on his latest novel, an historical thriller. His books and stories have been translated into fourteen foreign languages.

Monteleone has also written for the stage and television, having scripts produced for American Playhouse (which won him the Bronze Award at the International TV and Film Festival of New York and the Gabriel Award), George A. Romero’s Tales from the Darkside, and a series on Fox TV entitled Night Visions. He has written many feature-length screenplays, none of which have been produced.

Awards 
Montelone is a five-time winner of the Bram Stoker Award:
 His novel The Blood of the Lamb won the 1992 BSA for Best Novel in 1993.
 Borderlands 5, a horror anthology which Monteleone edited with Elizabeth Monteleone, won Best Anthology in 2003.
 In the same year, Monteleone's essay collection, The Mothers And Fathers Italian Association won BSA for Best Nonfiction.
 His 2004 collection, Fearful Symmetries gained the 2004 Award for Best Collection.
 Borderlands 6, a horror anthology which Monteleone edited with his daughter Olivia Monteleone, won Best Anthology in 2016.
In 2017, The Horror Writers Association honored him with their Lifetime Achievement Award. His membership and Lifetime Achievement Award benefits were revoked on January 31, 2023 by The Horror Writers Association for his not following the organization's anti-harassment policies. The violations included his decision to go on racist tirades and transphobic rants. Per HWA rules, 80% of the officers voted for his expulsion from the organization.

Politics
In a 1992 interview, Monteleone stated he was "registered as Independent". More recently, Monteleone has described himself as a libertarian. Discussing the issue of drug prohibition, Montelone has stated that "Now just because I'm not into the drug scene doesn't mean I'm any less of a good Libertarian. I think all drugs should be legalized". Monteleone argues that the War on Drugs cannot be won, that criminalization creates a "phantom economy" dominated by violent criminals, and that drug prohibition is a violation of individual liberty. Monteleone is an admirer of Ayn Rand, and has described her book Atlas Shrugged as a "personal barometer". Monteleone has also criticized the Clinton Administration for bringing an antitrust suit against the Microsoft corporation.

Personal life
Monteleone's wife, Elizabeth, co-manages Borderlands Press with Monteleone. Monteleone has a son and a daughter.

In 1967, while a student at the University of Maryland, Monteleone was involved in a UFO hoax, claiming that aliens had taken him to the planet "Lanulos." This story seemed to confirm the experiences of alleged contactee Woodrow Derenberger and was investigated by journalist John Keel.  Keel discusses the incident in several books (see chapter 14 of The Mothman Prophecies) and seems to have taken it seriously at the time, though Monteleone later confirmed it was a prank.  He came to regret the publicity and harassment that the hoax generated.

Works

Novels

Dragonstar series (with David Bischoff):
 Day of the Dragonstar, Berkley, 1983, 
 Night of the Dragonstar, Berkley, 1985, 
 Dragonstar Destiny, Ace Books, 1989, 

Standalone:
 Seeds of Change, Laser Books, 1975, 
 The Time Connection, Laser Books, 1976, 
 The Time-Swept City, Popular Library, 1977, 
 The Secret Sea, Popular Library, 1979, 
 Guardian, Doubleday, 1980, 
 Paperback reprint: Fawcett Popular Library, 1981, 
 Night Things (1980)
 Ozymandias (1981)
 Night Train (1984)
 Lyrica: A Novel of Horror and Desire (1986)
 Fantasma (1987)
 The Magnificent Gallery (1987)
 The Crooked House (1987) (with John DeChancie)
 The Blood of the Lamb (1992) – Bram Stoker Award (1992)
 The Resurrectionist (1995)
 Between Floors (1997)
 Night of Broken Souls (1997)
 The Reckoning (1999)
 Eyes of the Virgin (2002)
 Serpentine (2007)
 Submerged (2015)

Fiction collections
 Monster Tales: Vampires, Werewolves & Things (1973)
 Dark Stars and Other Illuminations (1981)
 Rough Beasts and Other Mutations (2003)
 Fearful Symmetries (Cemetery Dance Publications, 2004)  (Bram Stoker Award 2004)
 A Little Brown Book of Bizarre Stories" (2009)
 Dark Arts (2014)

Non-fiction
 The Arts and Beyond: Visions of Man's Aesthetic Future (1977)
 The Mothers and Fathers Italian Association (2003) (Bram Stoker Award 2003)
 The Complete Idiot's Guide to Writing a Novel (2004)
 The Complete Idiot's Guide to Writing a Novel, 2nd Edition (2010)

Books editedBorderlands series:
 Borderlands (1988)
 Borderlands 2 (1991)
 Borderlands 3 (1993)
 Borderlands 4 (1994) (with Elizabeth Monteleone)
 Borderlands 5 (with Elizabeth Monteleone), Borderlands Press, 2004
 Reprinted as From the Borderlands, Warner Books, 2004. (Bram Stoker Award 2003)
 Borderlands 6 (with Olivia Monteleone), Borderlands Press, 2016 (Bram Stoker Award 2017)

Other books:
 Random Access Messages of the Computer Age (1984)
 Microworlds'' (1985)

References

External links
 
 Bibliography at Fantastic Fiction

1946 births
Living people
20th-century American novelists
21st-century American novelists
American horror writers
American male novelists
American science fiction writers
American male short story writers
Writers from Baltimore
20th-century American short story writers
21st-century American short story writers
American libertarians
20th-century American male writers
21st-century American male writers
Novelists from Maryland
Writers of books about writing fiction
Loyola Blakefield alumni